Šterjo Nakov is a Macedonian businessman of Aromanian origin. His family origins from Kalin Kamen in Kriva Palanka Municipality. He is Honorary Consul of Romania in Macedonia.

Companies
 Feršped AD (1995)
Hotel Aleksandar Palace
 Hotel Metropol - Ohrid (2004)
 Skovin Winery (2001) 
 Feršped Broker

Allegedly he owns businesses in the ports of Thessaloniki, Greece and Durrës, Albania that was never confirmed.

Former companies
 Alfa TV (2008-2012)
 Rabotnichki Basketball Club (2000-2009)

Media
Šterjo Nakov was portrayed in the satirical animated TV Show Ednooki in 2007 and 2008.

Wealth
Rankings: 
 2012 2nd by Forbes ranking of Macedonian businessman
2014 2nd by European Research Company for wealth

Awards
 2008 Order of the Holy Macedonian Cross

External links
Feršped AD Official Page
Skovin Winery Official Page
Hotel Aleksandar Palace Official Page
Hotel Metropol Official Page 
Feršped Broker Official Page (Macedonian)

References

1984 births
Living people
Macedonian businesspeople
Macedonian people of Aromanian descent